Patrick Travis Swilling (born October 25, 1964) is an American former professional football player who was a linebacker in the National Football League (NFL). He played for the New Orleans Saints, Detroit Lions, and the Oakland Raiders. He had five Pro Bowl appearances in his NFL career and was the Associated Press (AP) NFL Defensive Player of the Year in 1991. He served from 2001 to 2004 as a member of the Louisiana House of Representatives.

College career
Swilling played for the Georgia Tech Yellow Jackets. He set the NCAA record for sacks in a game, with seven against North Carolina State and the Georgia Tech mark for sacks in a season (15). Voted first-team All-America in 1985, Swilling left Georgia Tech as the all-time sack leader and now ranks 5th.

Professional career
The New Orleans Saints fielded fierce defenses in  1991 and 1992, led by the best linebacker unit in the history of the league. In 1991, he had 17 sacks and was named NFL Defensive Player of the Year. In 1992, linebackers Rickey Jackson, Vaughan Johnson, Sam Mills, and Swilling, also known as the Dome Patrol, all played in the Pro Bowl, and the Saints led the league in quarterback sacks. Despite its tenacious defense, the team lost in the first round each time it made the playoffs during this time.

Swilling was traded to the Detroit Lions in 1993 for draft picks. In order to sign him, Detroit had to "unretire" the legendary Joe Schmidt’s number 56. In his first year with Detroit he made it to his fifth and final Pro Bowl. The Detroit Lions qualified for the playoffs in both of Swilling's seasons with the team, being eliminated each time, in the first round, by the Green Bay Packers. He finished his career with 107.5 sacks.

Swilling lost all six playoff games he played in; no other player in NFL history has more losses without a win.

Personal life
Swilling was a professional football player  from 1986 to 1998. In 2001, he won a special election as a Democrat to the Louisiana House for District 100 in New Orleans. He served for three years with assignments on the House Education, Retirement, and Transportation committees. He lost his bid for a full term as representative in the 2003 runoff election to his fellow Democrat Austin Badon, who polled 6,688 votes (53.3 percent) to Swilling's 5,851 (46.7 percent).

On April 30, 2009, Swilling was elected to the College Football Hall of Fame. He is currently a real estate developer in New Orleans. His son, Pat Swilling, Jr. signed to play basketball at the University of Tulsa on May 24, 2012. Two of his sons, Bruce Jordan-Swilling and Tre Swilling, play on the Georgia Tech football team. As of the 2020–2021 season, Bruce is a senior linebacker and Tre is a redshirt junior defensive back.

References

External links
Career Statistics

1964 births
Living people
People from Toccoa, Georgia
People from New Orleans
American football linebackers
American football defensive ends
Georgia Tech Yellow Jackets football players
New Orleans Saints players
Detroit Lions players
Oakland Raiders players
National Conference Pro Bowl players
College Football Hall of Fame inductees
Democratic Party members of the Louisiana House of Representatives
100 Sacks Club
National Football League Defensive Player of the Year Award winners